Raj Bhavan (translation: Government House) is the official residence of the governor of Chhattisgarh. It is located in the capital city of Raipur, Chhattisgarh.

See also
 Government Houses of the British Indian Empire

References

External links

Governors' houses in India
Buildings and structures in Raipur, Chhattisgarh
Government of Chhattisgarh
Buildings and structures in Chhattisgarh